Owain ap Gruffydd (c. 1130–1197) was a prince of the southern part of Powys and a poet. He is usually known as Owain Cyfeiliog to distinguish him from other rulers named Owain, particularly his contemporary, Owain ap Gruffydd of Gwynedd, who is known as Owain Gwynedd.

Owain was the son of Gruffydd ap Maredudd (and thus grandson of Maredudd ap Bleddyn) and nephew of Madog ap Maredudd, the last prince of the whole of Powys. Madog gave his nephew the cantref of Cyfeiliog to rule in 1147. On Madog's death in 1160 Owain became the ruler of most of southern Powys (this became known as Powys Wenwynwyn after it was inherited by his son). He married Gwenllian, one of the daughters of Owain Gwynedd.

He is recorded as having been in alliance with the other Welsh princes to withstand the invasion of 1165 by King Henry II of England. Thereafter he usually followed a policy of supporting the English crown. In 1170 he gave land for the founding of the abbey of Strata Marcella. In 1188, however, he refused to meet or support Baldwin, Archbishop of Canterbury and Giraldus Cambrensis when they journeyed around Wales to raise men for a crusade, and was excommunicated as a result. 

In 1195 Owain handed the rule of most of his realm to his son Gwenwynwyn and retired to the abbey of Strata Marcella, where he died and was buried two years later. His illegitimate son, Cadwallon, was given the commotes of Llannerch Hudol and Broniarth.

Owain has also long been considered a notable poet. Although only one poem ascribed to him has been preserved—Hirlas Owain—it is commonly rated as one of the finest Welsh poems of this period. In the poem, Owain's bodyguard are gathered at his court following a raid in 1155 to free his brother Meurig from prison in Maelor. The mission accomplished, Owain calls for the drinking horn to be passed to each member of his bodyguard in turn, with words of praise for each one. There is a more sombre note when he remembers two of his men who fell in the fighting and grieves for their loss. The poem's most recent editor, Gruffydd Aled Williams, has suggested that the poem was actually written by Cynddelw Brydydd Mawr, the preeminent Welsh court poet of the century, perhaps in collaboration with Owain.

Owain also appears in the romance of Fouke le Fitz Waryn as a knight who strikes Fulk with a spear.

References

John Edward Lloyd (1911) A history of Wales from the earliest times to the Edwardian conquest (Longmans, Green & Co.)

1130 births
1197 deaths
Monarchs of Powys
People excommunicated by the Catholic Church
Welsh princes
1130s births
12th-century Welsh monarchs
12th-century Welsh poets
Year of birth uncertain